Tuły  is a village in the administrative district of Gmina Lasowice Wielkie, within Kluczbork County, Opole Voivodeship, in southern Poland.

The village has a population of 268.

History
The village was first mentioned in the 13th century, when it was part of fragmented Piast-ruled Poland. Later on, it was also part of Bohemia (Czechia), Prussia, and Germany. In 1883, it had a population of 507.

During World War II, the Germans operated the E330 forced labour subcamp of the Stalag VIII-B/344 prisoner-of-war camp in the village. After Germany's defeat in the war, in 1945, the village became again part of Poland.

Transport
There is a train station in the village.

References

Villages in Kluczbork County